The Loravia LOR 75 is a French aircraft engine, designed and produced by Loravia of Yutz for use in ultralight aircraft. It was introduced in 2009.

By March 2018, the engine was no longer advertised on the company website and seems to be out of production.

Design and development
The LOR 75 is a three-cylinder four-stroke, in-line,  displacement, liquid-cooled, automotive conversion gasoline engine design, with a toothed poly V belt reduction drive with reduction ratios of 2.46 and 3.72:1. It employs electronic ignition and produces  at 6000 rpm, with a compression ratio of 10.5.

Applications
Best Off Skyranger
Gdecouv'R trike
Rans S-6 Coyote II

Specifications (LOR 75)

See also

References

External links
Press release and photo of engine

Loravia aircraft engines
Liquid-cooled aircraft piston engines
2000s aircraft piston engines